Hercílio Pedro da Luz (29 May 1860 – 20 October 1924) was a Brazilian politician who was the Governor of Santa Catarina.

References

External links
 

1860 births
1924 deaths
Governors of Santa Catarina (state)